Pes is the name of several rural localities in Pesskoye Settlement of Khvoyninsky District in Novgorod Oblast, Russia.

Pes (selo), a selo
Pes (village), a village